Paul Conway may refer to:

 Paul Conway (butcher) (born 1978), Scottish butcher
 Paul Conway (archivist) (born 1953), American academic
 Paul Conway (soccer) (born 1970), American soccer (football) player
 Paul T. Conway, former president of Generation Opportunity